The 1905 New Hampshire football team was an American football team that represented New Hampshire College of Agriculture and the Mechanic Arts during the 1905 college football season—the school became the University of New Hampshire in 1923. The team finished with a record of 2–4–2.

It is unclear if the team had a head coach. The New Hampshire College Monthly made several references to the team's captain and the team's student manager, but did not mention any coach. An article in The Burlington Free Press mentions "Coach Lord, who has charge of their team this year, was [the] star Yale end of 1902." This looks to be an errant and outdated reference to G. B. Ward, who coached New Hampshire's 1904 team and then began practicing law in Connecticut in 1905. New Hampshire's media guide lists Edward Herr as coach of the 1905 through 1907 teams. However, he was a student at Dartmouth College during the 1905–06 academic year, and upon his hiring to coach Vermont football for the 1908 season, it was noted that he had been coach at New Hampshire for the prior two years (1906 and 1907). Herr was first mentioned in the October 1906 edition of the College Monthly.

Schedule
Scoring during this era awarded five points for a touchdown, one point for a conversion kick (extra point), and four points for a field goal. Teams played in the one-platoon system and the forward pass was not yet legal. Games were played in two halves rather than four quarters.

This was the first season that the team played a schedule where all of its opponents were other college teams; since the program started in 1893, each season's schedule had included some high school, prep school, or athletic association teams.

The September 30 game was the first meeting between the New Hampshire and Brown football programs.

The October 28 game was the fourth meeting of the New Hampshire and Maine football programs. The score is listed as 16–0 in the New Hampshire football media guide and in contemporary news reports of 1905; College Football Data Warehouse and the Maine football media guide list it as 12–0.

New Hampshire's second team (reserves) lost to Brewster Academy in Wolfeboro, New Hampshire, 15–0; lost to Lowell Textile in Durham, 5–0; and lost a rematch with Brewster Academy in Durham, 15–10. On November 18, the varsity defeated a team of alumni, 12–5.

Roster
The team photo consists of all 13 lettermen, plus the student team manager.

Source:

Notes

References

Further reading
 

New Hampshire
New Hampshire Wildcats football seasons
New Hampshire football